Trichoderma theobromicola is a species of endophytic fungus in the family Hypocreaceae. It was first isolated from the trunk of a healthy cacao tree in Amazonian Peru. It produces a volatile antibiotic that inhibits development of M. roreri.

References

Further reading

External links

MycoBank

Fungal plant pathogens and diseases
Trichoderma
Fungi described in 2006